White Clay Creek State Park is a Delaware state park along White Clay Creek on  in New Castle County, near Newark, Delaware in the United States. North of the park is Pennsylvania's White Clay Creek Preserve, and the two were originally operated as bi-state parks to jointly protect the creek, but now they operate separately. The White Clay Creek is federally protected as part of the National Park Service's National Wild and Scenic Rivers System. White Clay Creek State Park offers  of nature and fitness trails which are open to hiking and mountain biking 365 days a year with access at a number of seasonal day-use fee parking lots. Fee season is in effect March 1 - November 30. Fees are $4 for in-state vehicle or $8 for out of state vehicles. Annual passes can be purchased at any DE State Park Office or online. The park also preserves a number of historic structures and operates a nature center. It is part of the Northeastern coastal forests ecoregion.

History
After World War II,  concerns over potential future water shortages in northern Delaware led to proposals to dam the White Clay Creek and flood the surrounding valley to create a reservoir. The Pennsylvania Railroad Company began purchasing land near the creek toward that end. In 1956, DuPont purchased the Pennsylvania Railroad Company land and began acquiring additional land in the valley to prevent further residential development. By the early 1960s, the dam proposal had begun moving forward, generating strong community opposition in both states. The opposition was led by local citizens and groups such as the United Automobile Workers union and the Sierra Club, who were concerned about the environmental impact as well as the loss of scenic and recreational open space. The non-profit White Clay Watershed Association was formed in 1965, with the aim of building opposition to the dam.

White Clay Creek State Park was established in 1968 as a small recreational park. By the mid-1970s, support for the dam had diminished.

With the dam proposal moribund, the National Park Service encouraged DuPont to donate the land to DE and PA to form joint park. Delaware Senator Joe Biden negotiated with DuPont and the states of Delaware and Pennsylvania to facilitate the donation. DuPont donated 1,234 acres to Pennsylvania and 528 acres to Delaware to form the bi-state White Clay Creek Preserve.

In 1988, the heirs of S. Hallock du Pont announced they were planning to sell off 850 of the estate's 2,000 acres, which had been held in trust for future generations. Seeking to limit the loss of open space, Governor Michael Castle began the purchase of 321 acres of the land which would connect Walter Carpenter State Park and the White Clay Creek Preserve to the Middle Run Valley Natural Area, a county-run park. In signing the agreement, Castle stated, "This is clearly more than just the land bridge we have been talking about. This means this section of northern Delaware will be protected against overdevelopment." The purchase was completed in the early 1990s, and in 1995, Walter S. Carpenter, Jr. State Park, the Delaware portion of the White Clay Creek Preserve, and the du Pont estate lands were joined together and renamed White Clay Creek State Park. 

In 1998, the state purchased an additional 500 acres of land in the form of the Judge Hugh M. Morris Estate, bordering the Middle Run Valley Natural Area. The purchase brought the park's total size to over 3,000 acres.

In 2000, Congress included the White Clay Creek in the National Park Service's National Wild and Scenic River program. This was the first instance of an entire watershed being so designated as opposed to portions of a river. The designation increases the level of protection on the lands in the valley.

Mason–Dixon Line
Portions of the Mason–Dixon line run through White Clay Creek State Park and the park preserves several historic resources associated with the line. The starting point of the survey, called the "post mark'd west," is located on Bryan's Field located within the park. Charles Mason wrote that, "...the point 15 miles South of the Southernmost Point of the City of Philadelphia is situated in Mill Creek Hundred in the County of Newcastle, in a Plantation belonging to Mr. Alexander Bryan." The spot is marked by a monument donated by S. Hallock du Pont in 1952 and can be found along the Bryan's Field trail. The arc corner surveyed by Mason and Dixon is also within the park, and is marked by a monument erected in 1892. Planning is underway on the construction of a trail which will connect White Clay Creek State Park to the 1849 tri-state monument where the borders of Delaware, Pennsylvania, and Maryland meet.

The Mason-Dixon Trail enters the park along a trail from the White Clay Creek Preserve and passes through the preserve on its way towards Newark.

Nearby state parks
Alapocas Run State Park (New Castle County)
Auburn Valley State Park (New Castle County)
Brandywine Creek State Park (New Castle County)
Elk Neck State Park (Maryland)
Fair Hill Natural Resources Management Area (Maryland)
Fort Delaware State Park (New Castle County)
Fort DuPont State Park (New Castle County)
Fort Mott State Park (New Jersey)
Fox Point State Park (New Castle County)
Lums Pond State Park (New Castle County)
Marsh Creek State Park (Pennsylvania)
Ridley Creek State Park (Pennsylvania)
Susquehanna State Park (Maryland)
Susquehannock State Park (Pennsylvania)
Wilmington State Parks (New Castle County) 
White Clay Creek Preserve (Pennsylvania)

Sources

References

External links
White Clay Creek State Park

State parks of Delaware
Protected areas established in 1968
Parks in New Castle County, Delaware
Nature centers in Delaware
1968 establishments in Delaware